David Šain (born 8 February 1988 in Osijek) is a Croatian rower.

He is an Olympic silver medalist in the men's quadruple sculls, having won silver at the 2012 Summer Olympics with Martin Sinković, Damir Martin and Valent Sinković.  This was also the team that won the men's quadruple sculls at the 2010 and 2013 World Championship and bronze at the 2011 World Championship.  They also won the gold at the 2009 and 2010 world under 23 championship.

References

 

1988 births
Living people
Croatian male rowers
Sportspeople from Osijek
Rowers at the 2012 Summer Olympics
Olympic rowers of Croatia
Olympic silver medalists for Croatia
Olympic medalists in rowing
Medalists at the 2012 Summer Olympics
World Rowing Championships medalists for Croatia
European Rowing Championships medalists